Dominic Bezzina (18th/19th centuries) was a minor Maltese philosopher who mainly specialised in physics. He also dealt with logic.

Life
It seems that Bezzina was born around the mid-18th century. After becoming a priest, he taught philosophy and science at the Cathedral School at Mdina, Malta. He was also a Canon at the Bishop's Cathedral Chapter. Bezzina taught at Mdina at least since 1819. One of the courses he delivered concerned physics.

Extant work
Bezzina's only extant work is called Institutum Philosophicum (Philosophical Teaching). It is still in manuscript form, and contains 171 back to back folios. Unfortunately, the document is certainly incomplete. The extant manuscript is just the first part of a larger work. It is not known how many further part the whole work contained.

The extant part of the Institutum concerns logic. The division is typically that of Scholasticism, organised in books, chapters, and articles. Throughout the work Bezzina discusses the nature and conditions of Aristotelian logic, consciousness, and the genesis of ideas.

References

Sources

See also
Philosophy in Malta

19th-century Maltese philosophers
Maltese educators
19th-century Maltese Roman Catholic priests